Gonzalo Garcia is a Spanish American ballet dancer. He joined the San Francisco Ballet in 1998, and was promoted to principal in 2002, at age 22. In 2007, he left the company and joined the New York City Ballet. He retired from performing in 2022 and remains in the company as a repertory director.

Early life
Garcia was born in Zaragoza, and trained at Maria de Avila's school. In 1995, he attended a summer intensive at the San Francisco Ballet School, where de Avila's daughter Lola taught. Later that year, he won the Prix de Lausanne at the age of 15, making him the youngest dancer to receive the award. After that, he returned to the San Francisco Ballet School as a full time student. At age 17, he was offered a contract to join the San Francisco Ballet by the artistic director, Helgi Tómasson, though Garcia decided to study for one more year.

Career
Garcia joined the San Francisco Ballet's corps de ballet in 1998, at age 18. In 2000, he became a soloist, and won the Princess Grace Award. In 2002, he was promoted to principal dancer at age 22, one of the youngest dancers in the company to reach this rank. He danced leading roles such as Albrecht in Giselle and Romeo in Romeo and Juliet, and originated the role of Nutcracker Prince in Tómasson's version of The Nutcracker. In 2004, he made a guest appearance at the New York City Ballet and danced Ballo della Regina, as a part of George Balanchine's centennial.

In May 2007, Garcia left the San Francisco Ballet after a performance of Don Quixote. Garcia joined the New York City Ballet as a principal dancer in October 2007. His repertoire there includes works by Balanchine and Jerome Robbins, and originated roles in works by choreographers such as Justin Peck and Alexei Ratmansky. He was coached by Mikhail Baryshnikov for Robbins' Opus 19/The Dreamer. He had performed with Christopher Wheeldon's company, Morphoses/The Wheeldon Company, and appeared in video advertisements of Tiffany & Co. and iPhone.

Garcia retired from performing in February 2022. He remains in the New York City Ballet as a repertory director.

Personal life
Garcia is a naturalized American citizen.

In August 2020, Garcia married Ezra Hurwitz, a dancer-turned filmmaker. They live in Upper West Side, Manhattan

Selected repertoire
Garcia's repertoire with the San Francisco Ballet and New York City Ballet includes:

Awards and honors
1995: Prix de Lausanne - gold medal
2000: Princess Grace Award

References

External links
New York City Ballet profile

Spanish male ballet dancers
New York City Ballet principal dancers
San Francisco Ballet principal dancers
Morphoses dancers
Living people
Year of birth missing (living people)
People from Zaragoza
Prix de Lausanne winners
Princess Grace Awards winners
21st-century ballet dancers
21st-century Spanish dancers
LGBT dancers
Spanish LGBT entertainers
Spanish emigrants to the United States
People with acquired American citizenship